United Chinese Bank may refer to:

United Overseas Bank, a Singaporean bank formerly known as United Chinese Bank
United Chinese Bank (Hong Kong), acquired by the Bank of East Asia in 1995